William I. Gunlock (April 25, 1895 – January 22, 1991) was born in Brooklyn, New York. He served in the California legislature and represented the 2nd District from 1941 to 1943.  During World War I he served in the United States Navy.

References

United States Navy personnel of World War I
Republican Party members of the California State Assembly
1895 births
1991 deaths